Maryland is a neighbourhood in Stratford in east London, England.  It is in the London Borough of Newham. The community centres around Maryland Station and borders Leytonstone to the north, Stratford New Town to the west and Forest Gate to the east, with Stratford town centre to the south-west.

History

Maryland's earliest known recorded appearance is on a map of Essex published by J. Oliver in 1696, where it is marked as 'Maryland Point'.  The origin of the name is uncertain. One popular theory is that it originated with a rich local merchant who bought land and built in the area having returned from the American colony of Maryland (itself named for Queen Henrietta Maria, wife of Charles I). If true, then London's Maryland would be unusual example of a place in Britain named after an American location, rather than vice versa.

Various attempts have been made to identify the merchant. The most likely candidate seems to be Richard Lee (1617–1664, great-great-grandfather of Confederate General Robert E. Lee), who emigrated to Virginia around 1640. He became a tobacco planter, trader, an owner and trader of slaves, and an employer and importer of English indentured servants. His estate there included land on the Maryland side of the Potomac River, near a place known as Maryland Point (later to be the site of the Maryland Point Light).  On returning to England in 1658, Lee bought land in Stratford, and in 1662 was recorded as owning a large house there.

However, retired history professor Ged Martin has questioned the American name-origin theory, finding limited documentary support for the story. Professor Martin put forward an explanation that the name derives from Old English words for a boundary, cognate to the Anglo-Saxon words maere and mearc.

With the growth of Stratford in the mid-19th century the vicinity was built up as Stratford New Town and Maryland gained a prosperous shopping thoroughfare. Maryland station opened in 1874.

Notable people 
'The Birthplace of Iron Maiden', Cart & Horses, 1 Maryland Point
Charles Edmund Clutterbuck (1806–1861), stained glass artist
Charles Hitchcock, grandfather to Alfred Hitchcock, fishmongery business at 20 Leytonstone Road
Dorothy Kilner (1755–1836), children's writer
Anna Kingsford (1846–1888), anti-vivisectionist, theosophist, suffragette and campaigner for women's rights, née Bonus, was born atMaryland Point

Transport

Maryland Station is served by Elizabeth line trains, with a frequency of 10 minutes in each direction.  Trains towards central London stop at Stratford before terminating at Liverpool Street station, with a journey time of 10 minutes. To the East, trains run a stopping service terminating at Shenfield. 
Maryland is served by bus routes 69 (24hr), 257, 308, and night bus N8.

Education

Local primary schools include Maryland Primary School, St. Francis' Catholic Primary School, and Colegrave Primary School.

References

Areas of London
Districts of the London Borough of Newham
Stratford, London